Joel Ngandu Kayamba (born 17 April 1992) is a Congolese professional footballer who plays as a midfielder for Boluspor in the TFF First League.

Club career

Early Czech Republic career 
He made his debut in a professional league in Pardubice's Czech National Football League 1–1 draw at České Budějovice on 6 November 2015. He signed for Opava in 2017. In his first season with Opava, he achieved promotion to the top tier of Czech football, Czech First League. He also won a National Football League Player of the Month award in that season. He scored the winning goal in Opava's first Czech First League victory - a 2–0 home win against Jablonec on 1 September 2018.

Viktoria Plzeň 
In September 2018, Kayamba signed a contract with FC Viktoria Plzeň for a speculated transfer fee of €800,000. Opava chairman Marek Hájek revealed that this move constituted a record transfer revenue for the club, breaking the previous record that was the sale of Libor Kozák. Kayamba would also stay at Opava on loan until the end of 2018.

International career
He made his debut for DR Congo national football team on 17 November 2020 in a Cup of Nations qualifier game against Angola. He substituted Jordan Botaka in the 80th minute.

Personal life 
He moved to the Czech Republic from France in 2013, married a Czech wife and has two children. He speaks four languages fluently: French, English, Czech and Lingala.

References

External links 

 
 
 Joel Ngandu Kayamba profile on the SFC Opava official website

1992 births
Living people
Democratic Republic of the Congo footballers
Democratic Republic of the Congo international footballers
Democratic Republic of the Congo expatriate footballers
21st-century Democratic Republic of the Congo people
Association football midfielders
Footballers from Kinshasa
Sharks XI FC players
1. FK Příbram players
FC Hradec Králové players
FC Viktoria Plzeň players
FK Pardubice players
SFC Opava players
Samsunspor footballers
Czech First League players
Czech National Football League players
TFF First League players
Democratic Republic of the Congo expatriate sportspeople in the Czech Republic
Democratic Republic of the Congo expatriate sportspeople in Turkey
Expatriate sportspeople in the Czech Republic
Expatriate sportspeople in Turkey
Boluspor footballers